Peter Five Eight is an upcoming American thriller film written and directed by Michael Zaiko Hall and starring Kevin Spacey.

Cast
Kevin Spacey as Peter
Jet Jandreau as Sam
Rebecca De Mornay as Brenda
Jake Weber

Production
Filming occurred in Siskiyou County, California in September 2021.  As of May 2022, the film has been completed.

References

External links
 

Upcoming films
American thriller films
Films shot in California
2023 films